Polycaena is a genus of butterflies of the subfamily Nemeobiinae within the family Riodinidae. The genus was erected by Otto Staudinger in 1886. The species are found in the eastern Palearctic, mainly in the Himalayas.

Cladogram from the Catalogue of Life:

References

Riodinidae